Günther Maas (born 15 November 1941 in Elm, Germany) is a German former wrestler who competed in the 1972 Summer Olympics.

References

External links
 

1941 births
Living people
Olympic wrestlers of West Germany
Wrestlers at the 1972 Summer Olympics
German male sport wrestlers
Sportspeople from Saarland